Bishnu S. Atal (born 1933) is an Indian physicist and engineer. He is a noted researcher in acoustics, and is best known for developments in speech coding. He advanced linear predictive coding (LPC) during the late 1960s to 1970s, and developed code-excited linear prediction (CELP) with Manfred R. Schroeder in 1985.

In 1987, Atal was elected as a member into the National Academy of Engineering for innovative research in the area of linear predictive coding of speech.

Biography
Atal was born in India, and received his BS degree in physics (1952) from the University of Lucknow, a diploma in electrical communication engineering (1955) from the Indian Institute of Science, Bangalore  and a PhD in electrical engineering (1968) from Brooklyn Polytechnic Institute.

From 1957 to 1960, he was a lecturer in acoustics at the Department of Electrical Communication Engineering, Indian Institute of Science, Bangalore.

In 1961 Atal joined Bell Laboratories, where his subsequent research focused on acoustics and speech, making major contributions in the field of speech analysis, synthesis, and coding, including low bit-rate speech coding and automatic speech recognition. He advanced and promoted linear predictive coding (1967), and developed code-excited linear prediction (1985) with Manfred R. Schroeder.

He retired in 2002 to become affiliate professor of Electrical Engineering at the University of Washington.

Atal holds more than 16 U.S. patents, and is a member of the National Academy of Engineering and National Academy of Sciences, and a fellow of the Acoustical Society of America and of the Institute of Electrical and Electronics Engineers. He received the 1986 IEEE Morris N. Liebmann Memorial Award "for pioneering contributions to linear predictive coding for speech processing", and the 1993 IEEE ASSP Society Award for contributions to linear prediction of speech, multipulse, and code-excited source coding. He is the Franklin Institute's 2003 Benjamin Franklin Medal Laureate in Engineering.

Selected works 
 US Patent 4,472,832: Digital speech coder

References 
 New Jersey Inventors of the Year
 IEEE Signal Processing Society Speech Technical Committee (STC) newsletter
 Voice Communication Between Humans and Machines

External links
 From “Harmonic Telegraph” to Cellular Phones – Bishnu Atal talks about the history of telecom invention and his role in pushing cell phone technology (Aug 23, 2016 at USC, event, book)

1933 births
Members of the United States National Academy of Sciences
Living people
Members of the United States National Academy of Engineering
Fellow Members of the IEEE
Scientists at Bell Labs
Indian Institute of Science alumni
University of Lucknow alumni
Polytechnic Institute of New York University alumni
Fellows of the Acoustical Society of America
Speech processing researchers